The Worcester News is a local newspaper, and the only daily newspaper in Worcester (UK), reporting on breaking news and local matters covering the City of Worcester and surrounding areas within the county. It was previously named Worcester Evening News until it was rebranded in July 2005.

The newspaper is published Monday to Saturday at its offices in Redhill House, Worcester.

The newspaper is owned by Newsquest Media Group, which was acquired by USA-based Gannett in 1999.

The Worcester News was named Midlands Best Local Newspaper of the Year in 2010.

Sections
The Worcester News has dedicated sections throughout the week:
 Wednesday Edition: Jobs pages
 Thursday Edition: Property Supplement
 Friday Edition: Motoring Section
 All editions: News, events, reviews, opinions.

References

External links
 Worcester News website
 @worcesternews on Twitter

1935 establishments in England
Culture in Worcester, England
Daily newspapers published in the United Kingdom
Newspapers published by Newsquest
Newspapers published in Worcestershire
Publications established in 1935